Mormaer Maol Choluim I of Lennox (English: Malcolm I) ruled the Mormaerdom of Lennox, between 1250 and 1303, succeeding his father Maol Domhnaich.

He was an early supporter of the Bruces, and appeared before Edward I of England in 1292 amongst the supporters of Robert Bruce, 5th Lord of Annandale. Maol Choluim joined the revolt of Andrew de Moray and William Wallace.

Maol Choluim married a woman named Marjorie, and fathered his successor Maol Choluim II

He died in 1303.

Bibliography
 Neville, Cynthia J., Native Lordship in Medieval Scotland: The Earldoms of Strathearn and Lennox, c. 1140-1365, (Portland & Dublin, 2005)

1303 deaths
People from Stirling
Year of birth unknown
Mormaers of Lennox
13th-century mormaers
14th-century Scottish earls